Phool Nagar  (Punjabi and ), previously Bhai Pheru, is a city of the Kasur District in the Punjab province of Pakistan. The city is named after the former Minister of the area Rana Phool Muhammad Khan.

Location

Surrounding area
A road leading off from here takes one to the Changa Manga planted forest.

See also
Govt. Degree College Phool Nagar, Kasur (Boys)

References

Populated places in Kasur District